Savage Breed is a 1980 Italian drama film directed by Pasquale Squitieri. It was entered into the 12th Moscow International Film Festival.

Cast
 Saverio Marconi as Mario Gargiulo
 Stefano Madia as Umberto Saraceni
 Imma Piro as Michelina
 Simona Mariani as Anna Saraceni
 Enzo Cannavale as Don Peppino
 Cristina Donadio as Giuliana
 Angelo Infanti as Carlo Esposito
 Victoria Zinny
 Manuel Laghi
 Geoffrey Copleston

References

External links
 

1980 films
1980 drama films
Italian drama films
1980s Italian-language films
Films directed by Pasquale Squitieri
1980s Italian films